2312 is  a hard science fiction novel by American writer Kim Stanley Robinson, published in 2012. It is set in the year 2312 when society has spread out across the Solar System. The novel won the 2013 Nebula Award for Best Novel.

Plot summary
The novel is set in the year 2312, in the great city of Terminator on Mercury, which is built on gigantic tracks in order to constantly stay in the planet's habitable zone near the terminator. Swan Er Hong, an artist and former asteroid terrarium designer, is grieving over the sudden death of her step-grandmother, Alex, who was very influential among the inhabitants of Terminator. After the funeral procession, a conference is held among the family and the close friends of Alex, some of whom Swan has never heard of. This includes Fitz Wahram, a native of the moon Titan, whom Swan dislikes. Following the conference, Swan decides to head out to Io to visit another friend of Alex's, called Wang, who has designed one of the largest qubes, or quantum computers.  While Swan is visiting Wang on Io, an apparent attack of some sort fails. An attack on Terminator shortly follows; a meteorite of artificial origin destroys the city's tracks, stopping the city and exposing it to sun, essentially cooking it. As Swan travels, she learns more of the mystery surrounding her grandmother's death and the destruction of her home-city of Terminator. With Wahram and Genette, Swan travels throughout the solar system and investigates an escalating series of conspiracies.

Inspector Genette eventually discovers how the artificial meteorite that destroyed Terminator was created: someone launched a large number of smaller objects on trajectories that would eventually cause them to coalesce above Mercury, but low enough that the planet's defense system could not destroy the now large object in time. The complexity of the attack leads her to determine that quantum computers must have been used.

Meanwhile, Swan and Wahram become involved in restoring and re-wilding the climate-change-ravaged Earth by returning thousands of species from space-based temporary environments to their home environments on the Earth.

Characters
 Swan Er Hong. An artist and former asteroid terrarium designer 
 Fitz Wahram. Diplomat from the moon Titan 
 Jean Genette. A "small" who was a close friend to Alex 
 Alex. Influential and deceased scientist and diplomat. Swan's grandmother 
 Mqaret. A scientist and Alex's partner 
 Kiran. A young Earth boy who saves Swan from some trouble in his slum-like home town. In thanks, Swan gives him a job off-planet.

Science and technology
In the world of the novel, the planets Mercury, Venus, and Mars are inhabited by humans, as are the moons of Saturn and Jupiter. Humans have a presence or are building a presence on all the inhabitable surfaces within the solar system (including moons and satellites). Almost all of the Solar System's largest asteroids have been hollowed out to form "terrariums", which include interior artificial environment designed to mimic various biomes found on earth or combinations of different biomes. Some of these serve as animal reserves or farms for endangered or underproduced flora and fauna. Humans take shuttles to these asteroids and use them as transportation around the system. Some of these terraria fail, such as one where a mistake in programming led to the near-destruction of the asteroid, and another where a small crack in the terrarium's ice wall destroyed most of its population.

In the novel, scientific and technological advances, such as human enhancement, settlements on other planets, and terraforming, have opened gateways to an extraordinary future. One major innovation are the qubes, which are quantum computers possessing artificial intelligence, often small enough that the wearer can have one implanted into their head or attached to their person, like one might wear a watch or carry a phone.  Digital, as opposed to quantum, AI is still in use but is being supplanted by the smaller and much more powerful qubes.

Capitalism has been replaced by a planned economy described as based on the mondragon concept controlled by the quantum computers, but on Earth there are still remnants of the market system.

Sex, sexuality, and gender
Gender and sexuality within this world is fluid and expansive, with the principal categories of gender and sexuality listed to include feminine, masculine, androgynous, ambisexual, bisexual, neuter, eunuch, nonsexual, undifferentiated, gay, lesbian, queer, invert, homosexual, polymorphous, poly, labile, berdache, hijra, and two-spirit.

As part of a lifespan extending process many people exhibit intersex or "gynandromorphous" sex characteristics, including both penises and vaginas.

Development
Terminator, a city that slowly drives around Mercury to stay out of direct line from the Sun, first appeared in Robinson's earlier novel The Memory of Whiteness, as well as appearing during a brief mention in his Mars Trilogy. Terminator is also briefly mentioned in Robinson's 2015 novel Aurora.

Reception
Critical reception for 2312 has been mixed to positive, with Strange Horizons saying that "readers must make up their own minds". Slate Magazine and the Guardian both reviewed 2312, with Slate praising the book as "brilliant" while the Guardian criticized the book's ending as "contrived". Writing for the Los Angeles Times, Jeff VanderMeer called the book a "treasured gift to fans of passionate storytelling", writing that the book's "audacity" was an asset.

The book won the 2013 Nebula Award for Best Novel, was nominated for the 2013 Hugo Award for Best Novel, was shortlisted for the 2012 BSFA Award for Best Novel and the 2013 Arthur C. Clarke Award, was honor listed for the 2012 James Tiptree, Jr. Award,. It was nominated for the 2012 Goodreads Choice Award for science fiction.

See also

References

2012 American novels
2012 LGBT-related literary works
Novels by Kim Stanley Robinson
2012 science fiction novels
Novels set in the 24th century
American science fiction novels
Novels set on Mercury (planet)
Nebula Award for Best Novel-winning works
Novels about intersex
LGBT speculative fiction novels
American LGBT novels
2010s LGBT novels
Orbit Books books